Wilderness Rim is a census-designated place (CDP) in King County, Washington, United States. The population was 1,523 at the 2010 census.

Geography 
Wilderness Rim is located in eastern King County at  (47.446975, -121.768572).

References

External links 
 Wilderness Rim Association

Census-designated places in King County, Washington